is a junction passenger railway station in the city of Ōta, Gunma, Japan, operated by the private railway operator Tōbu Railway.

Lines
It is the terminus for the Koizumi Line and Kiryū Line.

Station layout

The station consists of three elevated island platforms serving six tracks, with the station building located underneath. Platforms 7 and 8 are situated at the western end of platforms 1 and 2, and platforms 9 and 10 are situated at the western end of platforms 3 and 4 respectively.

Platforms

Adjacent stations

History
The station opened as a station on the Isesaki Line on 17 February 1909. From 17 March 2012, station numbering was introduced on all Tobu lines, with Ōta Station becoming "TI-18".

Passenger statistics
In fiscal 2019, the station was used by an average of 11,705 passengers daily (boarding passengers only).

Surrounding area
 Mount Kanayama
 Kanayama Castle
 Daikōin Temple
 Takayama Shrine
 Gunma University Ōta campus
 Fuji Heavy Industries (former Nakajima Aircraft Company plant before World War II)

See also
List of railway stations in Japan

References

External links

 Tobu station information 

Tobu Isesaki Line
Tobu Kiryu Line
Tobu Koizumi Line
Stations of Tobu Railway
Railway stations in Gunma Prefecture
Railway stations in Japan opened in 1909
Ōta, Gunma